Kendriya Vidyalaya Maharajganj is a secondary school affiliated to the CBSE board in Maharajganj, Bihar. The current principal is Mr. Suresh Kumar. It was established in 2012. It is part of the Kendriya Vidyalaya Sangathan.

History
The Kendriya Vidyalaya Sangathan is the organization set up by the Ministry of Human Resource Development (MHRD) to oversee the Kendriya Vidyalaya schools. To cater to the educational needs of the children of Central government employees, K.V. Maharajganj started functioning with two hundred students in 2012.
The school has primary and secondary divisions. It is a co-educational institution, with classes from V to X, affiliated to the Central Board of Secondary Education (CBSE), New Delhi.

Management
This school is managed by Kendriya Vidyalaya Sangathan, an autonomous organization of the Ministry of Human Resource Development. Main affairs of school are looked after by the KVS regional office in Patna. Deputy Commissioner is head of  Region and District Magistrate  of the concerned district is the Chairman of the Vidyalaya Management Committee with local educationists, public representatives and officials from the District as members. The school principal is Suresh Kumar.

School Session
The school year is from April to March. Days are divided into eight-periods with summer and winter timings. The order in which the classes meet varies from day to day.

Student council

The Student Council is a body of student representatives, headed by the School Captain. It is made up of the captains of the teams and representatives from other co-curricular activities along with elected and nominated students of each class from grade VI through X. Parliamentary procedure is used at meetings and the main purpose of this group is to assist the Principal, staff, and students in fulfilling their responsibilities. The student members help maintain order in the school during the Assembly and breaks, in between classes, and also on important occasions like the Annual Day.

The Student Council is elected every year (in April) through the election in the supervision of Principal and responsible teachers. It administers the Vidyalaya at student basis and has responsibility for student discipline, decorum and other activities.( No Political Parties involved)

School Captains

1.Akshay Bharadwaj (2012–14)

2.Prawej Alam (2 April 2014 to 3 June 2014)

3.Suraj Prajapati (2014-2016)

4.S.Abid Haider (2016-2018)

5.Gyaneshwar Kushwaha (2018-2019)

6.Nikhil Kumar (2019–present)

Premises 
The school operates from a temporary building located in the campus of Shri Gauri Shankar Vidyalaya, Ujaen, Maharajganj, Siwan district, Bihar, India.

Infrastructure
There are 5 classrooms, 1 science lab, a fully automated library, a computer lab, a children's playground, a cricket pitch, a volleyball court, and an athletics field.

Staff and curriculum 

The staff consists of 10 teachers, supervised by the Principal.

Gallery

See also
 List of Kendriya Vidyalayas

References

Kendriya Vidyalayas